The Battle of Mirali was a bloody military engagement occurred between 7 October and 10 October 2007 and involved Taliban militants and Pakistani soldiers around the town of Mirali, Pakistan (North Waziristan), the second biggest town in the semi-autonomous region on the border with Afghanistan.

Timeline of the battle 

According to the Pakistani Armed Forces, the clashes broke out on 7 October after militants set off improvised explosive devices and conducted ambushes on a Pakistani convoy, near the town of Mirali. The subsequent engagements killed nearly 200 people. The army says the casualties were militants and soldiers but local people reported at least ten civilians were among the dead. Hundreds of people fled Mirali after more than 50 houses were damaged in the fighting.

After a number of attacks on military convoys, near Mirali, the Pakistan Army sent helicopter gunships and Pakistan Air Force jet fighters to target suspected militant positions in several villages around that region.

On 9 October, according to the Pakistani Army, military aircraft struck "one or two places" near Mirali. There were confirmed reports that about 50 militants had been killed.

Truce
On 15 October, Pakistani soldiers and tribal fighters in the northwestern province of North Waziristan agreed to a truce, and the Pakistani forces lifted the curfew over the area. This truce was over by the end of the month.

See also
List of drone strikes in Pakistan

References

External links 
Pakistani border death toll rises (BBC)

Mir Ali
2007 in Pakistan
Mir Ali
Mir Ali
Waziristan
October 2007 events in Pakistan